"She Moves (Far Away)" is the 2014 debut single by German DJ and producer Alle Farben from his debut album Synesthesia - I Think in Colours and features the vocals of Graham Candy. It was released  on Sony Music. The song was co-written by Frans Zimmer (real name of Alle Farben), Graham Candy, Jan Hammele and Andreas Huber.

Music video

Two different music videos have been released for the song.

The first one, released on 8 April 2014 and dubbed "Street Video", includes footage of thousands of people attending a DJ event featuring Alle Farben (Frans Zimmer) on the tarmac of the phased out Berlin Tempelhof Airport, dancing to his tunes while flashes of colour are splashed all across the screen, a tribute to his name meaning "all colours" and as a reference to the debut Synesthesia album (full title Synesthesia - I Think in Colours).

The official video, directed by Franck Trebillac, depicts Graham Candy travelling on a bike to reach his lover, who is dancing at an Indian party. On his way he passes through different lands and climates and cycles past Alle Farben, disguised each time as someone different (a peasant, a skier or a runner). At the end of the video Candy eventually reaches the girl in an Indian-like land and dances with her.

Charts
The single has charted in a number of European charts including a top 10 showing on the German Singles Chart.

Chart performances

Year-end charts

Certifications

References

Alle Farben songs
2014 songs
2014 singles